The 2017–18 season was PEC Zwolle's 107th season of play, it marked its 16th season in the Eredivisie and its 6th consecutive season in the top flight of Dutch football.

Competitions

Friendlies

Eredivisie

League table

Results summary

Results by matchday

Matches

KNVB Cup

Statistics

Squad details and appearances

Legend

Transfers

In

Out

References

PEC Zwolle seasons
PEC Zwolle